Neolamprologus brevis is a species of cichlid endemic to Lake Tanganyika where it lives in snail shells, primarily of the genus Neothauma.  It feeds is on plankton.  This species can reach a length of  TL.  This species can also be found in the aquarium trade. The males are much larger than the females and can be identified even at a young age.

References

brevis
Taxa named by George Albert Boulenger
Fish described in 1899